Kate McKenna (born 27 September 1989) is an Irish former cricketer who played as a right-handed batter. She appeared in 7 Twenty20 Internationals for Ireland in 2014. She played in the Super 3s for Typhoons.

Field hockey
In 2009–10, together with Cecelia and Isobel Joyce, Emer Lucey and Nicola Evans, McKenna was a member of the Railway Union team that won the Women's Irish Hockey League title.

References

External links

1989 births
Living people
Irish women cricketers
Ireland women Twenty20 International cricketers
Typhoons (women's cricket) cricketers
Cricketers from County Dublin
Irish female field hockey players
Railway Union field hockey players
Women's Irish Hockey League players